The O 21 class was a class of seven submarines, built for the Royal Netherlands Navy. The boats were still incomplete at the start of the German invasion of the Netherlands O 21, O 22, O 23 and O 24 were hastily launched and escaped to the United Kingdom. O 25, O 26 and O 27 were not able to escape and were captured by the German forces. The Kriegsmarine ordered the completion of the boats and they entered German service as UD-3, UD-4 and UD-5.

Design
One of the requirements the Royal Netherlands Navy set for the O 21-class was that it had to be able to dive  deeper than the previous class, which was the O 19-class submarine.

Construction
The ships were built by three different shipyards. O 21 and O 22 were built by the Koninklijke Maatschappij. 
O 23, O 24, O 26 and O 27 by R.D.M, Rotterdam and O 25 also in Rotterdam at Fijenoord shipyard.

References

Bibliography

External links
Description of class

Submarines of the Netherlands